Parvoscincus sisoni  is a species of skink found in the Philippines.

References

Parvoscincus
Reptiles described in 1997
Taxa named by John W. Ferner
Taxa named by Rafe M. Brown
Taxa named by Allen Eddy Greer